Arneil is a surname. Notable people with the surname include: 

Gavin Arneil (1923–2018), Scottish paediatric nephrologist
John Arneil (1862–1938), New Zealand cricketer
Rodger Arneil (born 1944), Scotland rugby player
Steve Arneil (1934–2021), South African-British practitioner